Nathan C. Gianneschi is the Jacob & Rosaline Cohn Professor of Chemistry, Materials Science & Engineering, and Biomedical Engineering at Northwestern University and the Associate Director for the International Institute for Nanotechnology. Gianneschi's lab takes an interdisciplinary approach to nanomaterials research, with a focus on multifunctional materials for biomedical applications, programmed interactions with biomolecules and cells, and basic research into nanoscale materials design, synthesis and characterization.

Gianneschi is a Sloan Research Fellow, a Fellow of the Royal Society of Chemistry, a Fellow of the American Institute for Medical and Biological Engineering, and is a 2010 recipient of the Presidential Early Career Award for Scientists and Engineers.

Education and training 
Gianneschi graduated with a B.Sc. (Honors) in chemistry from the University of Adelaide in 1999. During his undergraduate, he conducted honors research with Dr. Louis Rendina on the synthesis of hydrogen-bonded platinum-containing macrocycles. Following this, he moved to Evanston, Illinois to pursue graduate studies at Northwestern University with Prof. Chad Mirkin and Prof. SonBinh Nguyen. There, he developed supramolecular catalysts that exhibit allosteric behavior, that is, exhibit increased reactivity when the catalyst molecule is modified at a site distinct from the catalyst site. Gianneschi graduated in 2005 with his Ph.D. From 2005 to 2008, he was a Dow Foundation Fellow (through the American Australian Association) at The Scripps Research Institute with Prof. M. Reza Ghadiri, where he worked on a strategy to modulate natural enzymes into programmable complexes that can perform simple logic operations.

Independent career 
Gianneschi began his independent career as an assistant professor at the University of California, San Diego in 2008. He was promoted to Associate Professor in 2014, and full Professor in 2016. He was appointed the Teddy Traylor Faculty Scholar and Professor of Chemistry and Biochemistry, Materials Science and Engineering and NanoEngineering. In 2017, he moved to Northwestern University.

References 

Northwestern University faculty
American materials scientists
Living people
Year of birth missing (living people)
Sloan Research Fellows
University of California, San Diego faculty
Fellows of the Royal Society of Chemistry